Jackie Swanson (born June 25, 1963) is an American actress. She is best known for her role on the American sitcom Cheers as Kelly Gaines the rich, simple love interest of Woody Boyd and as Amanda Hunsaker in the first Lethal Weapon movie.

Biography

Career

In 1985, Swanson made her professional debut in the Prince video Raspberry Beret as the girl wearing the raspberry-colored beret who hands Prince his guitar at the beginning of the song. She and Prince were friends. He wrote a song entitled "Palomino Pleasure Ride" for her. In 1987, Swanson made her feature debut in the opening scene of Lethal Weapon. She played Amanda Hunsaker, who falls to her death from a building onto the roof of a car. She performed this free-fall stunt from 35 feet into an airbag under the training of stuntman Dar Robinson. Lethal Weapon would be Swanson's first time working with cinematographer Steven Goldblatt. She worked with Steven Goldblatt again on Charlie Wilson's War.

In 1989, Swanson joined the cast of Cheers in the recurring role of Kelly Gaines. Her character was a pretty, wealthy, naïve, Lutheran girl, who would eventually marry Woody Boyd, played by Woody Harrelson. She continued to appear in the show until the series ended in 1993.

In 1991, she had a recurring role in the series Baby Talk. In 1992, Swanson appeared on the cover of TV Guide. Swanson modeled in runway show for Ralph Lauren. In 2002, she appeared in an automotive TV commercial in which she was seen driving a GM vehicle to pick up her husband, who emerged from a submarine that popped through thick ice.

Swanson has appeared in a number of other national ad campaigns including commercials for: Broan (directed by Academy Award-winning director Joachim Back), Stacy's Pita Chips (directed by Christian Loubek), Orville Redenbacher (directed by Zach Math), Hummer (directed by Nick Lewin), Ford (directed by Eric Saarinen, son of architect Eero Saarinen and grandson of architect Eliel Saarinen) and Toyota (directed by Jeff Karnoff, and in which she portrayed the wife of Jim Belushi). Swanson also made a public service announcement for the Partnership for a Drug Free America/Anti-Meth Campaign (directed by Michael Patterson).

Filmography 

Lethal Weapon (1987) as Amanda Hunsaker
Slam Dance (1987) as Mystery girl (uncredited)
It's Alive III: Island of the Alive (1987) as Tenant
Less than Zero (1987) as Jandie (uncredited)
The Charmings (1988, TV Series) as Candy
Perfect Victims (1988) as Carrie Marks
Almost Grown (1988, TV Series)
She's the Sheriff (1989, TV Series) as Cherie
Cheers (1989–1993, TV Series) as Kelly Gaines / Boyd
The People Next Door (1989, TV Series) as Debbie
Dragnet (1990, TV Series) as Miss Carpen
Baby Talk (1991, TV Series) as Stella
The Golden Girls (1992, TV Series) as Tracy
Oblivion (1994) as Mattie Chase
Hope & Gloria (1995, TV Series) as Sister Theresa
Oblivion 2: Backlash (1996) as Mattie Chase
Artie (2000) as Dana Wilson
NYPD Blue (2001, TV Series) as Trish Howlett
Cold Case (2005, TV Series) as Sarah 1993
Charlie Wilson's War (2007) as Texas Socialite (uncredited)
 Reality Inc (2011, TV Series) as Mrs. Blackburn

References

External links
 
 Yahoo Movies Biography
 Yahoo TV Biography

1963 births
American film actresses
American television actresses
Living people
Northern Michigan University alumni
Actresses from Grand Rapids, Michigan
20th-century American actresses
21st-century American actresses